Mata Mansa Devi is a Hindu temple dedicated to goddess Mansa Devi, a form of Shakti, in the Panchkula district of the Indian state of Haryana.

It is one of the prominent Shakti Pitha temples of North India involving 7 Shakti goddesses, namely Mata Mansa Devi, Naina Devi, Jawalamukhi, Chintpurni, Brajeshwari, Chamunda Devi and Jayanti Devi. Thousands of devotees visit the shrine from various parts of the country, and especially during the Navratra mela, this number rises to lakhs every day for the nine auspicious days.

History

Construction of temples 

There are 3 temples in the complex and the main temple is the oldest. Maharaja Gopal Das Singh of Mani Majra, who was enthroned in 1783, constructed the present main temple of Shri Mansa Devi, which is situated on the Shivalik foothills in the village Bilaspur, Tehsil and District Panchkula, during the period 1811–1815. At a distance of 200 meters from the main temple is the Patiala Shivalaya temple which was constructed by Karam Singh, a Jat Sikh, the then Maharaja of Patiala in the year 1840. This temple had the patronage of Manimajra Princely State.

Neglect after independence of India 

After the merger of Princely states into PEPSU the Patronage of State Govt. ended and the temples remained neglected. The Raja of Manimajra then appointed pujari as ‘khidmatuzar’ to serve this temple whose duty was to worship the deity of the temple.

After the merger of princely State into PEPSU these pujaris became independent in the matter of controlling and managing the affairs of the temple and the land attached to the temple. They could neither maintain this temple nor provide necessary facilities to the visiting devotees and thus the condition of the temple deteriorated day by day. So much so that there were no proper arrangements for pilgrims visiting the temple during Navaratra melas.

Formation of Shri Mata Mansa Devi Shrine Board (SMMDSB) 

As a result of the neglect, the Government of Haryana took over the temple and set up the "Shri Mata Mansa Devi Shrine Board (SMMDSB) Panchkula" trust to manage the temple. The complex was in awfully neglected condition till the establishment of the SMMDSB trust. Because of the popularity of the temple for its religious and historical significance and also for fulfilling the wishes of the lakhs of devotees thronging to the complex, the Government of Haryana by an enactment (Haryana Act No. 14 of 1991) christened as "Shri Mata Mansa Devi Shrine Act (1991)" took over the control of this temple to provide for better infrastructure development, management, administration and governance of Shri Mata Mansa Devi Shrine and its endowments including lands and buildings attached to the Shrine. A Shrine Board with Chief Minister of Haryana as chairman was constituted for running of the Temple and preserving the heritage of the region.

SMMDSB also manages the Chandi Mandir after which both the Chandigarh city and Chandimandir Cantonment are named.

Conservation and enhancements 

It was reported in 2021 that the Government of India has allocated INR 25cr (US3.3 million), under the Under the PRASAD scheme, to Mata Mansa Devi Shrine Board for the upgrade of facilities in and around Mata Mansa Devi temple. New temple corridor was complete in 2021 and old stones were replaced by granite. And the main entrance gate will be renovated too. In 2021, temple receives between 2000 and 3000 devotees every day and there is fixed price list for the religious services.

Temple complex

Three temples and architecture

There are 3 temples in the complex, main temple of Shri Mansa Devi built during 1811–1815 by Maharaja Gopal Das Singh of Mani Majra is oldest, Patiala Shivalaya temple constructed in 1840 by Patiala's Maharaja Karam Singh is at a distance of 200 m from the main temple of  Shri Mansa Devi.Haryana Samvad , Oct 2018, p39.</ref> In the Shiva temple, there are 38 panels of wall paintings as well as floral designs painted on the ceiling and arches leading to the temple, which according to an inscription were painted by Aged in Vikram Samvat 1870 (813 CE).

Festivals: Navratra mela 

Navratra festival is celebrated in the mandir for nine days. Twice a year millions of devotees visit the temple. Shardiya Navratra Mela is organized at the shrine complex during Chaitra and Ashvin months. Every year two Navratra melas are organized in the month of Ashvin (Shardiya, Sharad or Winter Navratra)  and others in the month of Chaitra, Spring Navratra by the Shrine Board.

Lakhs of devotees pay obeisance during the Navratra Mela held in Ashvin and Chaitra and temples remain open throughout the day. This melas are of nine days duration each time and concludes on the ninth day. The shrine Board makes elaborate arrangements for the comfortable stay and darshan of the devotees. The board makes arrangements for the provision of Chhowldari, tented accommodation, durries, blankets, temporary toilets, temporary dispensaries, mela police posts, and lines.

During the mela, Duty Magistrates and Nodal Officers are appointed to look after the devotees and smooth conduct of the mela. On the seventh and eighth day of Navratras, the temples of the Shrine Complex are closed only for two hours during the night for cleaning maintenance of the temples. For the rest of Navratras, the temples remain open for darshan from 5 a.m. to 10 p.m.

Transport

Located at a distance of about 10  km from the Chandigarh bus terminus and 4  km from the Panchkula bus terminus, the Mansa Devi temple can be reached by local buses

Chandigarh Transport Undertaking and Haryana Roadways supply special buses during the Navratra fair. There are daily flights operated by private airlines to Chandigarh. Since it is a popular travel circuit, bookings ought to be made well in advance. Chandigarh is the ideal place to start if intending to visit the temple. If traveling by train, Chandigarh is the nearest railhead for those heading to Mata Mansa Devi. It is situated on the Chandigarh–Kalka rail line. 
 Nearest railhead: Chandigarh
 Nearest airport: Chandigarh

Institutes within temple complex 

The temple management, in conjunction with various govt entities, is undertaking construction of the following at the land belonging to the temple on this site:

 Mata Mansa Devi Sanskrit College, Panchkula: Its construction will commence soon on 2.10 acre land.
 Mata Mansa Old Age Home, Panchkula: Five story building is under construction in 2021 July at a cost of INR 10.48 crore will be completed by 15 January 2022.
 National Institute of Ayurveda, Pnachkula: Is being constructed by the Union Ministry of AYUSH at 19.87 acre land, and there will be a INR 2.2 crore disgnostic centre as well. It will have 59766.79 sqm constructed area  59766.79 entailing hospital building, college and administration building, student hostels, international students hostel, academic block, guest house, residential houses for the staff, director's bungalow, boundary wall & entry gates with security guard's cabins, auditorium, utilities such as electric sub station, water tanks with pump room, 325 KLD STP/ETP, etc. Site is in Seismic Zone IV. Sukhna Wild Life Sanctuary is 6.2 km and Sukhna Lake is 3.5 km northwest, Chandi Mandir Cantonment is 0.65 km.

Other Mansa Devi temples

This is list of Mansa Devi temples around India and elsewhere.
 Andhra Pradesh
 Mansa Devi Temple, Chinadugam, Srikakulam
 Mansa Devi Temple, Dornipadu, Kurnool
 Mansa Devi Temple, Kanumalapalle, Kadapa
 Mansa Devi Temple, Kurnool
 Mansa Devi Temple, Mukkamala, West Godavari
 Mansa Devi Temple, Naidupeta, Nellore
 Mansa Devi Temple, Nellore
 Mansa Devi Temple, Thurpu Rompidodla, Nellore
 Mansa Devi Temple, Tilaru, Srikakulam
 Mansa Devi Temple, Vadluru, West Godavari
 Bihar state 
 Mansa Devi Temple, Sitamarhi
 Delhi state
 Mansa Devi Temple, Narela
 Haryana state
 Mata Mansa Devi temple, Panchkula
 Punjab state
 Mansa Devi Temple, Sangrur
 Rajasthan state
 Mansa Devi Temple, Alwar
 Shri Mansa Mata Mandir, Sikar
 Uttrakhand state
 Mansa Devi Temple, Bilwa Parvat, Haridwar
  Uttar Pradesh state
 Maa Mansa Devi Mandir, Mathura
 West Bengal state
 Mansa Bari, Kolkata

See also 

 Hindu pilgrimage (yatra)
 Hindu pilgrimage sites
 List of Hindu temples
 List of India cave temples
 Cave research in India
 List of Caves in India
 List of rock-cut temples in India
 Indian rock-cut architecture
 List of colossal sculpture in situ
 List of Monuments of National Importance in Haryana
 List of State Protected Monuments in Haryana
 List of Indus Valley Civilization sites in Haryana
 List of National Parks & Wildlife Sanctuaries of Haryana, India
 Haryana Tourism

References

External links
 Mata Mansa Devi Mandir, Official website

Shakti temples
Hindu temples in Haryana
Tourist attractions in Panchkula district
Devi temples in India